ECW Press is a Canadian book publisher located in Toronto, Ontario.  It was founded by Jack David and Robert Lecker in 1974 as a Canadian literary magazine named Essays on Canadian Writing.  They started publishing trade and scholarly books in 1979.

ECW Press publishes a range of books in fiction, non-fiction, poetry, sport, and pop culture. In 2015, Publishers Weekly listed ECW Press as one of the fastest-growing independent publishers in North America. ECW Press releases around 50 new titles a year.

History 
The company was founded by Jack David and Robert Lecker in 1974 as a Canadian literary magazine named Essays on Canadian Writing. Five years later, ECW published its first books—trade and scholarly titles. It started with two principal series: the Annotated Bibliography of Canada's Major Authors (ABCMA) and Canadian Writers and Their Works (CWTW). Through the 1980s, ECW upgraded its typesetting facilities, published reference titles and began to service third-party clients, creating books for corporations to use for promotional purposes and events such as anniversaries. In the 1990s, ECW re-commenced trade publishing and expanded its scholarly and reference lines for high school and public libraries. They started publishing a mix of commercial books alongside their literary books, such as pop culture books (the first being The Duchovny Files: The Truth Is in Here by Paul Mitchell, published in 1995, a biographical dossier on actor David Duchovny that includes episode guides of The X-Files), sports books, and genre fiction.

Robert Lecker left the company in 2003.

Titles

Fiction
Steve Stanton, Reconciliation, Retribution, Redemption, Freenet
Heather Tucker, The Clay Girl
Jen Sookfong Lee, The Conjoined
Anne Emery, Cecilian Vespers, The Sign of the Cross, Obit, Ruined Abbey, Death at Christy Burke's, Lament for Bonnie, Children in the Morning, and Barrington Street Blues 
Joey Comeau, Overqualified
Cordelia Strube, On the Shores of Darkness, There Is Light
John McFetridge, Dirty Sweet: A Mystery, Everybody Knows This is Nowhere, Swap: A Mystery, Tumblin' dice
Kevin J. Anderson, Clockwork Lives (with Neil Peart), Clockwork Angels (with Neil Peart), editor of 2113: Stories Inspired by the Music of Rush
Amanda Leduc, The Miracles of Ordinary Men
Randal Graham, Beforelife, Afterlife Crisis, and Nether Regions.

Non-fiction
Neil Peart, Ghost Rider: Travels on the Healing Road, Roadshow, Far and Away, Far and Near, Far and Wide
Darcy McKeough, The Duke of Kent
Maude Barlow, Boiling Point
George Bowering, The Hockey Scribbler
Barry Avrich, Moguls, Monsters and Madmen
Geri Jewell, I'm Walking as Straight as I Can
Liisa Ladouceur, Encyclopedia Gothica
Liisa Ladouceur, How to Kill a Vampire: Fangs in Folklore, Film and Fiction
Emm Gryner, The Healing Power of Singing: Raise Your Voice, Change Your Life (What Touring with David Bowie, Single Parenting and Ditching the Music Business Taught Me in 25 Easy Steps)

Poetry
Marilyn Dumont, The Pemmican Eaters
Judith Fitzgerald, River
Ashley-Elizabeth Best, Slow States of Collapse
Robert Priest, Reading the Bible Backwards
Jamie Sharpe, Cut-up Apologetic
Patrick Woodcock, You can't bury them all
George Murray, Whiteout, Glimpse, Diversion
Emily Schultz, Songs for the Dancing Chicken
R. M. Vaughan, Ruined Stars
Paul Vermeersch, The Fat Kid
Hawksley Workman, Hawksley Burns for Isadora
Gillian Sze, "Fish Bones"

Sports
Tim Hornbaker, National Wrestling Alliance, The Untold Story of the Monopoly that Strangled Pro Wrestling, Capitol Revolution, 
Yvonne Bambrick, The Urban Cycling Survival Guide
Val James, Black Ice
Red Kelly, The Red Kelly Story
Pat Patterson, Accepted
Dennis Hull, The Third Best Hull
Bruce Hart, Straight from the Hart
Heath McCoy, Pain and Passion: The History of Stampede Wrestling
Marsha Erb, Stu Hart: Lord of the Ring
Greg Prato, Sack Exchange
Bryan Alvarez & R.D. Reynolds, The Death of WCW: 10th Anniversary Edition
Dylan "Hornswoggle" Postl, Life Is Short & So Am I

Pop Culture
 Lindsay Gibb, National Treasure
 Crissy Calhoun, Love You To Death, Spotted: your one and only unofficial guide to Gossip Girl
 Jesse McLean, Wait For It
 Graeme Burk and Robert Smith?, Who's 50, Who Is The Doctor, The Doctors Are In
 Greg Renoff, Van Halen Rising

References

External links 
 

Book publishing companies of Canada
Small press publishing companies
Publishing companies established in 1974